Haut-Rhin (Alsatian: Owerelsàss or ;) is a département in the Grand Est region, France, bordering both Germany and Switzerland. It is named after the river Rhine. Its name means Upper Rhine. Haut-Rhin is the smaller and less populated of the two departments of the former administrative Alsace region, the other being the Bas-Rhin (Lower Rhine).  Especially after the 1871 cession of the southern territory known since 1922 as Territoire de Belfort, although it is still densely populated compared to the rest of metropolitan France. It had a population of 767,842 in 2020.

On 1 January 2021, the départements of Bas-Rhin and Haut-Rhin were merged into the European Collectivity of Alsace.

History 
Haut-Rhin is one of the original 83 départements, created during the French Revolution, on 4 March 1790 through the application of the law of 22 December 1789 in respect of the southern half of the province of Alsace (Haute-Alsace).

Its boundaries have been modified many times:
 1798, it absorbed Mulhouse, formerly a free city, and the last Swiss enclave in the south of Alsace;
 1800, it absorbed the whole département of Mont-Terrible;
 1814, it lost the territories which had been part of Mont-Terrible, which were returned to Switzerland, except for the old principality of Montbéliard;
 1816, it lost Montbéliard, which was transferred to the département of Doubs;
 1871, it was mostly annexed by Germany (Treaty of Frankfurt). The remaining French part formed the Territoire de Belfort in 1922;
 1919, it was reverted to France (Treaty of Versailles) but remains administratively separated from Belfort.
 1940, it was annexed de facto by Nazi Germany.
 1944, it was recovered by France.

Geography 
Haut-Rhin is bordered by the Territoire de Belfort and Vosges départements and the Vosges Mountains to the west, the Bas-Rhin département to the North, Switzerland to the south and its eastern border with Germany is also the Rhine. In the centre of the département lies a fertile plain. The climate is semi-continental.

Subdivisions
The department consists of the following arrondissements:
Altkirch
Colmar-Ribeauvillé
Mulhouse
Thann-Guebwiller

Principal towns

The most populous commune is Mulhouse; the prefecture Colmar is the second-most populous. As of 2020, there are 11 communes with more than 10,000 inhabitants:

Demographics 
Population development since 1801:

Economy 
Haut-Rhin is one of the richest French départements. Mulhouse is the home of the Stellantis Mulhouse Plant automobile factory, where the Peugeot 2008 and Peugeot 508 are currently built. The lowest unemployment rate in France can be found in the Southern Sundgau region (approximately 2%). The countryside is marked by hills. Many Haut-Rhinois work in Switzerland, especially in the chemical industries of Basel, but commute from France where living costs are lower. However, the region does have some of France's worst socio-economic inequalities; Mulhouse has long been one of France's poorest major cities.

Law 

Alsace and the adjacent Moselle department have a legal system slightly different from the rest of France. The statutes in question date from the period 1871 - 1919 when the area was part of the German Empire. With the return of Alsace-Lorraine to France in 1919, Paris accepted that Alsace and Moselle should retain some local laws in respect of certain matters, especially with regard to hunting, economic life, local government relationships, health insurance and social rights. It includes notably the absence of any formal separation between church and state: several mainstream denominations of the Christian church benefit from state funding, in contrast to principles applied in the rest of France.

Politics

Presidential elections 2nd round

Current National Assembly Representatives

Tourism

Culture 
 Alsatian language

See also
Cantons of the Haut-Rhin department
Communes of the Haut-Rhin department
Arrondissements of the Haut-Rhin department

References

External links

  Prefecture website
  Collectivité européenne d'Alsace

  

 
1790 establishments in France
Grand Est region articles needing translation from French Wikipedia
Departments of Grand Est
States and territories established in 1790